Naiktha Bains (born 17 December 1997) is an Australian-British tennis player.

Bains has won two singles and 17 doubles titles on the ITF Women's Circuit. She has reached best WTA ranking of world No. 199 in singles. On 24 September 2018, she peaked at No. 134 in the WTA doubles rankings.

Bains emigrated with her Indian-born father Gurnake from Britain to Brisbane aged eight and holds dual British-Australian citizenship.

Career

2014
Bains commenced the year with a ranking of 1041. She was awarded a wildcard into qualifying at the Hobart International, where she made it through the first two rounds, defeating Maria Elena Camerin and Teliana Pereira, before losing to eventual tournament champion, Garbiñe Muguruza, in the final qualifying round.

At the qualifying for the Australian Open, Bains lost to Andrea Hlaváčková in straight sets, but together with Olivia Tjandramulia, she was awarded a wildcard into the main doubles draw where they faced 14th-seeded team of Julia Görges and Barbora Záhlavová-Strýcová, also losing in straight sets.

In March, Bains was awarded a wildcard into the qualifying of the Miami Open, for just her third appearance at WTA Tour-level. She lost in round one to Virginie Razzano. Her next match was in September in Vegas, before playing four more ITF tournaments across Australia to end the year. She ended the year with a ranking of 713.

2015
Her season began with a wildcard into the qualifying rounds of the Brisbane International, Hobart International and Australian Open. She lost in round one in all three events. The rest of the year, Bains competed on the ITF Circuit, with limited success. She ended the year with a ranking of 630.

2016
Bains commenced the season with a wildcard into the qualifying rounds of the Brisbane International, Hobart International and Australian Open. She lost in the first round in all three events. Through February and March, she competed on the ITF Circuit across Australia, before heading to Croatia and Spain where she made three consecutive quarterfinals.
From June to October, she competed on the ITF Circuit across Europe, Asia and Australia. Her best result was reaching the quarterfinal of the Bendigo International.
Bains finished 2016 season ranked world No. 452.

2017
Thanks to a wildcard, she entered the qualifying of the Brisbane International where she lost in round one to Anastasia Rodionova.

Grand Slam performance timelines

Singles

Doubles

ITF Circuit finals

Singles: 6 (2 titles, 4 runner–ups)

Doubles: 34 (17 titles, 17 runner-ups)

Notes

References

External links

 
 
 

1997 births
Living people
Sportspeople from Leeds
Australian female tennis players
British female tennis players
Naturalised citizens of Australia
Naturalised tennis players
Tennis people from Queensland
British sportspeople of Indian descent
Australian sportspeople of Indian descent
English emigrants to Australia
English people of Indian descent
Tennis players at the 2014 Summer Youth Olympics
Tennis people from West Yorkshire